Peter Alwen Close (born 1 June 1943) is a former English cricketer.  Close was a right-handed batsman who bowled right-arm off break.  He was born in Murree, Punjab Province, in the British Raj (today in Pakistan).  He was educated at Haileybury and Imperial Service College in England.

While studying at Cambridge University, Close made his first-class debut for Cambridge University Cricket Club against Glamorgan in 1964.  He made fourteen further first-class appearances for the university, the last of which came against Oxford University in 1965.  In his fifteen first-class matches, he scored 344 runs at an average of 13.76, with a high score of 54.  This score, which was his only first-class fifty, came against Glamorgan in 1965.

Close also played Minor counties cricket for Dorset, making his debut for the county in the 1963 Minor Counties Championship against Wiltshire.  He played Minor counties cricket for Dorset from 1963 to 1966, making 29 Minor Counties Championship appearances.

References

External links
Peter Close at ESPNcricinfo
Peter Close at CricketArchive

1943 births
Living people
People from Murree
People educated at Haileybury and Imperial Service College
Alumni of the University of Cambridge
English cricketers
Cambridge University cricketers
Dorset cricketers
Cricketers from Punjab, Pakistan